Talca is a city and commune in Chile located about  south of Santiago, and is the capital of both Talca Province and Maule Region (7th Region of Chile). As of the 2012 census, the city had a population of 201,142.

The city is an important economic center, with agricultural (wheat) and manufacturing activities, as well as wine production. It is also the location of the Universidad de Talca and the Catholic University of Maule, among others. The Catholic Church of Talca has held a prominent role in the history of Chile.

Demographics
Of these, in 2002, 193,755 (96%) lived in urban areas and 8,042 (4%) in rural areas. The city had about 233,339 inhabitants (111,796 men and 121,543 women), according to the 2015 census. The population grew by 15.63% (31,542 persons) between the 2002 and 2015 censuses.

History

The city was founded in 1692 by Tomás Marín de Poveda and refounded as Villa San Agustín de Talca in 1742 by José Antonio Manso de Velasco.

The city played a role in Chile's independence. For example, the siege of Talca took place there on March 4, 1814, and the Battle of Cancha Rayada on March 29 and the Second battle of Cancha Rayada, on March 16. 1818. Also, on February 12, 1818, Bernardo O'Higgins signed the Chilean declaration of independence.

Talca Province was founded in 1833. This ended the dependency of Colchagua Province. Also, Talca was a focus of insurrection during the revolutions of 1851 and 1859.

Talca was partially destroyed by the 1928 Talca earthquake and the 2010 Chile earthquake, being rebuilt both times. It sits near the epicenter of the 2010 8.8 magnitude earthquake and suffered severe shaking causing the collapse of much of the historic town centre.

Administration

As a commune, Talca is a third-level administrative division of Chile administered by a municipal council, headed by an alcalde who is directly elected every four years. The 2008–2012 alcalde is Juan Castro Prieto (Independent Democratic Union, centre-right).

Within the electoral divisions of Chile, Talca is represented in the Chamber of Deputies by Sergio Aguiló (PS) and Germán Verdugo (RN) as part of the 37th electoral district, which consists entirely of the Talca commune. The commune is represented in the Senate by Juan Antonio Coloma Correa (UDI) and Andrés Zaldívar Larraín (PDC) as part of the 10th senatorial constituency (Maule-North).

Geography and climate
The city is bisected by the Pan-American Highway.

Talca has a Mediterranean climate (Köppen: Csb) with dry summers and wet winters, though it is hotter in summer and cooler in winter than coastal cities like Valparaíso and Concepción.

Transportation
Talca has a public bus system managed by the municipal Department of Transportation. The routes are tracked through Moovit.

Gallery

See also
Maule River
Descabezado Grande
Radal Siete Tazas National Reserve
Altos de Lircay National Reserve
 Juan Albano Pereira Márquez

References

External links

  Municipality of Talca
 Urban Umbrella Architectural Exhibition
 Talca's Gate
 El aMaule
 La Prensa
 El Centro
 WWW.DELMAULE.CL

.
Communes of Chile
Capitals of Chilean regions
Capitals of Chilean provinces
Populated places established in 1742
1740s establishments in the Captaincy General of Chile
1740s establishments in the Viceroyalty of Peru
1742 establishments in the Spanish Empire